The Praga E-210 was a four-seat, twin-engined touring aircraft built in Czechoslovakia in the late 1930s.  It had an unusual pusher configuration .  Its tail unit and undercarriage were modified significantly before World War II and after the war a more powerful version designated E-211 was flown.

Design and development

The Praga E-210 was designed as a four-seat tourer or air-taxi.  It seems to have appeared in public for the first time at the Paris Exhibition of late 1936, though it is not known whether it had made its first flight by then.  It was a high wing cantilever monoplane, with an enclosed cabin for four ahead of the wing and in 1936 a conventional tailwheel fixed undercarriage and single fin. It was unusual in adopting a pusher configuration, with two engines close to the fuselage driving small propellers. Its layout was thus much like that of the Carden-Baynes Bee, its almost exact contemporary though a much smaller aircraft.

The wing of the E-210 was made in a single piece, a wooden structure built around two spars and plywood covered. The leading edge was significantly swept, but the trailing edge was straight. The ailerons were steel framed and fabric covered.  Between them and the engines were Schrenk type landing flaps.  The 85/95 hp (63/71 kW) Walter Minor four cylinder inverted in line engines were cantilevered from the rear spar on steel frames, with fairings both above and below the wings.

The flat sided fuselage was built on a steel tube framework, narrowing to the rear.  The rounded nose and the cabin were plywood skinned and the rest fabric covered.  The spatted mainwheels were mounted on short cantilever struts, making only a shallow angle to the ground and with the shock absorbers inside the fuselage.  On the original aircraft there was a small castorable tailwheel, but later this was supplanted by a spatted, steerable nose wheel with a faired leg.  By mid-1937 the original single fin had been replaced by a twin endplate fin arrangement.  The fixed surfaces were wooden framed and plywood covered, the tailplane attached to the top of the fuselage and braced externally from below.  The split elevators were fabric covered over wood, with trim tabs and the horn balanced rudders were of fabric covered steel.

The cabin was well forward of the leading edge, providing good visibility, and seated four in two rows, the front seats having dual control.  There was a baggage compartment behind the rear seats, accessible from inside.  Photographs show that access to the cabin was through a single, port side door.

The date of the first flight is not known, but by the July 1937 Prague Aero Show it had been flying long enough for the directional control problem implied by the revised empennage to have been both recognised and addressed.  It is also not known when the undercarriage was altered. There is a report from March 1939 which says that the E-210 was then in production, though March was also the month of the German occupation of Czechoslovakia, so it is not clear if any further aircraft were completed.  If so, they or the prototype may have been used by the occupying forces as transports, or following Flight's suggestion, as Army Co-Operation machines.

Post War development: Praga E-211

An E-210 was at the first post war Paris Exhibition in late 1946.  Praga continued development and in 1947 produced the E-211.  This used the more powerful, 105 hp (78 kW) Walter Minor 4-111 engines and had a central fin in addition to the endplates.  It had the tricycle undercarriage of the earlier E-210, but was now described as a 4–5 seater and had better access, with a starboard side door opening onto the front seats and a port side door for the rear seat passengers. The door revisions brought in train some changes to the side glazing of the cabin. Fin and tailplane were covered with fabric, in place of the plywood covering of the E.210.

As far as is known, only one E-211, registered OK-BFA, was built.  There were plans for a light freighter version of the E-211. Also planned and under construction in late 1947 was an 8-seat development, the E-212, but it may never have flown.

Variants
E.210 4 seater, powered by 2x  Walter Minor 4 engines, flown in the late 1930s with limited, if any, production.
E.211 A 5-seater developed version emerging in 1947, powered by 2x  Walter Minor 4-III engines or 2x  Praga E 8-cylinder horizontally-opposed engenes.
E.212 A planned 8-seater enlarged version, not proceeded with.

Operators

Slovak Air Force (1939–45)

Specifications (E-210)

Citations

Cited sources

E-210
1930s Czechoslovakian civil aircraft
Twin-engined pusher aircraft
High-wing aircraft
Aircraft first flown in 1936
Twin-tail aircraft